Softball was contested by participating nations at the 1983 Pan American Games in Caracas, Venezuela.

Medal summary

Medal table

Medalists

Softball at the Pan American Games
Events at the 1983 Pan American Games
1983 in softball
Softball competitions in Venezuela